Benjamin Littles was a Negro league outfielder between 1948 and 1950.

Littles made his Negro leagues debut in 1948 with the New York Black Yankees. He went on to play for the Philadelphia Stars in 1950, his final professional season.

References

External links
 and Seamheads

Place of birth missing
Place of death missing
Year of birth missing
Year of death missing
New York Black Yankees players
Philadelphia Stars players
Baseball outfielders